Summit Airport  is a public-use airport located  north of the central business district of Middletown, in New Castle County, Delaware, United States. It is privately owned by Summit Aviation, Inc. It is included in the Federal Aviation Administration (FAA) National Plan of Integrated Airport Systems for 2017–2021, in which it is categorized as a reliever general aviation facility.

Facilities and aircraft 
 Runway 17/35: 4,487 x 65 ft (1,368 x 20 m), surface: asphalt
 Runway 11/29: 3,600 x 200 ft (1,097 x 61 m), surface: turf

For the 12-month period ending May 31, 2002, the airport had 89,600 aircraft operations, an average of 245 per day: 99.7% general aviation, 0.2% air taxi and 0.1% military. There are 103 aircraft based at this airport: 87% single engine, 5% multi-engine, 1% jet aircraft and 7% helicopters.

References

External links 

Airports in Delaware
Transportation buildings and structures in New Castle County, Delaware
Middletown, Delaware